Diethyl sulfite (C4H10O3S) is an ester of sulfurous acid.  Among other properties, diethyl sulfite inhibits the growth of mold spores during grain storage.

Diethyl sulfite is used as an additive in some polymers to prevent oxidation.

See also
 Dimethyl sulfite
 Diethyl sulfate
 Diethyl sulfoxide

References

External links
 WebBook page for C4H10SO3

Organosulfites
Ethyl esters